J'Marcus Webb (born August 8, 1988) is an American football offensive tackle who is a free agent. He was drafted by the Chicago Bears in the seventh round of the 2010 NFL Draft. He played college football at West Texas A&M.

Webb has played for the Minnesota Vikings, Kansas City Chiefs, Oakland Raiders, Seattle Seahawks, Indianapolis Colts, and Miami Dolphins.

Early years
Webb played football at North Mesquite High School in Mesquite, Texas.

College career
In 2006, as a freshman, Webb played for the University of Texas Longhorns. The Longhorns went 10–3 and Webb played in the 2006 Alamo Bowl. In 2007, Webb transferred to Navarro College, and in 2008, he transferred to West Texas A&M University.

Professional career

Chicago Bears
Webb was selected in the seventh round (218th pick overall) of the 2010 NFL Draft by the Chicago Bears. On May 16, 2010, Webb agreed to a four-year deal with the Bears.

In 2012, Webb was listed as the starting left tackle ahead of Chris Williams. In 2013, after the Bears signed Jermon Bushrod, Webb shifted to right tackle. On August 30, 2013, Webb was placed on  waivers by the Bears.

Minnesota Vikings
On September 1, 2013, Webb was claimed off waivers by the Minnesota Vikings. On December 17, 2013, he was waived by the Minnesota Vikings.

Kansas City Chiefs
On May 19, 2014, Webb was signed by the Kansas City Chiefs. He was released on August 30, 2014.

Oakland Raiders
On April 2, 2015, Webb signed a one-year, $745,000 free agent contract with the Oakland Raiders.

Seattle Seahawks
On March 15, 2016, the Seattle Seahawks signed Webb to a two-year, $5.75 million free agent contract that includes $2.45 million guaranteed and a signing bonus of $1.20 million. Webb was slated to be the starting right tackle but suffered a knee injury and was replaced by Garry Gilliam. He was released by the Seahawks on November 22, 2016.

Webb was suspended the first four games of the 2017 season on January 21, 2017.

Indianapolis Colts
On July 30, 2018, Webb signed with the Indianapolis Colts. Webb started Week 1 at right tackle but sustained a hamstring injury and was placed on injured reserve on September 11, 2018.

On April 5, 2019, Webb re-signed with the Colts. He was released during final roster cuts on August 31, 2019.

Miami Dolphins
On September 6, 2019, Webb was signed by the Miami Dolphins.

Indianapolis Colts (second stint)
On December 12, 2020, Webb was signed to the Indianapolis Colts' practice squad. He was elevated to the active roster on December 26 for the team's week 16 game against the Pittsburgh Steelers, and reverted to the practice squad after the game. His practice squad contract with the team expired after the season on January 18, 2021.

References

External links
Oakland Raiders bio 
Kansas City Chiefs bio 
Chicago Bears bio 
CBS Sports bio
Indianapolis Colts bio

1988 births
Living people
American football offensive tackles
Chicago Bears players
Indianapolis Colts players
Kansas City Chiefs players
Miami Dolphins players
Minnesota Vikings players
Navarro Bulldogs football players
Oakland Raiders players
Seattle Seahawks players
Players of American football from Fort Worth, Texas
Texas Longhorns football players
West Texas A&M Buffaloes football players
Brian Piccolo Award winners